The Estadio Nacional Complutense (or Complutense National Stadium in English), is a rugby union stadium in the Spanish capital Madrid and located on the main campus of the Complutense University of Madrid. The stadium is commonly used by the Spanish national rugby union team who competes in the European Nations Cup. It is also home to Olympus Rugby XV Madrid, CD Arquitectura and CR Cisneros.

History
The plans for the construction of the University City, and thus also of rugby stadium, began on 17  May 1927, when the then King Alfonso XIII awarded the construction contract. The official architects of the venue were Luis Lacasa Navarro, Javier Barroso and the famous Civil engineer Eduardo Torroja. The opening ceremony of the sports facilities and the stadium was on 12 October 1943, on the Spanish national holiday.

Originally, the stadium was built for university sports, but in 1954 the Spanish national rugby union team used the stadium for a home match against Portugal, Spain won 23-0. Following the high number of spectators, the stadium was made the home stadium for the men's rugby team, hosting all home matches in the European Nations Cup and any friendly's that occur during the Mid-year rugby union tests or the End-of-year rugby union tests.

Gallery

See also
 Rugby union in Spain
 Spanish Rugby Federation

References

Estadio Nacional Complutense
Rugby union stadiums in Spain
Sports venues completed in 1943
Sports venues in Madrid
Buildings and structures in Ciudad Universitaria neighborhood, Madrid